Pedro Silva is a former Portuguese footballer who played as a half-back.

He is mostly known for his five-year spell at Benfica, where he won two major honours.

Career
Silva arrived at Benfica in 1929 and made his debut on 17 February, against Belenenses. He played 10 games in all competitions, scoring seven goals, helping the club win the Campeonato de Portugal. The following season, he scored once in five games in the same competition, with Benfica retaining the trophy. In 1931–32, he played alongside Guedes Gonçalves, but Benfica only reach the semi-finals of the Campeonato de Portugal.

A year later, he played three games in the Campeonato de Lisboa, scoring once, as Benfica won a competition. In his last year at Benfica, he only played twice in the Campeonato de Lisboa, subsequently leaving the club with 24 goals in 50 appearances and winning three honours.

Honours
Benfica
Campeonato de Portugal: 1929–30, 1930–31
Campeonato de Lisboa: 1932–33

References
General
 

Specific

Year of birth unknown
Year of death unknown
Portuguese footballers
Association football midfielders
S.L. Benfica footballers